

Belgium
 Congo Free State –  Théophile Wahis, Governor-General of the Congo Free State (1892–1908)

France
 French Somaliland – Pierre Hubert Auguste Pascal, Governor of French Somaliland (1906–1908)
 Guinea –
 Jules Louis Richard, acting Lieutenant-Governor of Guinea (1906–1907)
 Joost van Vollenhouven, acting Lieutenant-Governor of Guinea (1907)
 Georges Poulet, acting Lieutenant-Governor of Guinea (1907–1908)

Japan
 Karafuto –
 Kumagai Kiichirō, Governor-General of Karafuto (28 July 1905 – 31 March 1907)
 Yukihiko Konosuke, Governor-General of Karafuto (1 April 1907 – 24 April 1908)
 Korea – Itō Hirobumi, Resident-General (1905–1909)
 Taiwan – Sakuma Samata, Governor-General of Taiwan (15 April 1906 – May 1915)

Portugal
 Angola –
 Eduardo Augusto Ferreira da Costa, Governor-General of Angola (1906–1907)
 Henrique Mitchell de Paiva, Governor-General of Angola (1907–1909)

United Kingdom
 Barotziland-North-Western Rhodesia
 Robert Thorne Coryndon, Administrator of Barotziland-North-Western Rhodesia (1897–1907)
 Hugh Hole, Administrator of Barotziland-North-Western Rhodesia (1907)
 John Carden, acting Administrator of Barotziland-North-Western Rhodesia (1907–1908)
 Malta Colony
Charles Clarke, Governor of Malta (1903–1907)
Henry Grant, Governor of Malta (1907–1909)
 North-Eastern Rhodesia
 Robert Edward Codrington, Administrator of North-Eastern Rhodesia (1898–1907)
 Lawrence Aubrey Wallace, Administrator of North-Eastern Rhodesia (1907–1909)
 Straits Settlement – John Anderson, Governor of the Staits Settlement (1904–1911)

Colonial governors
Colonial governors
1907